Hope Music Group (sometimes known plainly by the initials as, HMG) is a Cameroonian record label that mainly produces hip hop, urban & popular music. It is distributed by The Orchard, a subsidiary of Sony Music Entertainment. The label produces and distributes various artists as Locko, J-Rio, Fanicko, Dynastie le tigre, Michael Kiessou, Featurist, Duc-Z and record labels as White House Music, Tiger Production, MKO Music. 
Hope Music Group was founded by Philippe Nkouaya in 2012. The label's first release was a mixtape by his music producer Philjohn.

History

2011 - 2014 : DeadZone Recordz to Hope Music 
The company was founded in February 2012 by Philippe Nkouaya and Anthony Gorby in Douala, Cameroon. But before the era, the premisces of the label was based on a previous label founded by Philippe and associates, DeadZone Recordz which was shutdown in 2011.
Active independent label in popular music, the company developed many activities in order to offer a formula as 360 deals (music recording, visual content production, development, promotion and music publishing). HMG signed independent artists as Michael Kiessou, Yvich and gained partnerships with MTN Cameroon (AIM), Putumayo World Music (Content connect Africa) .

2014 - 2016 : Sony Music/The Orchard Partnership 
In April2015, HMG entered an exclusive distributed deal with Sony Music Entertainment's main distribution service company The Orchard (company) for a 4-year deal.

HMG energized the breakthrough of Cameroonian urban music by managing artists and developing urban music styles in Cameroon and abroad.
The label catalog is rather modern, Pop, Contemporary R&B, world music, electronic music, reggae, soul and hip-hop. 
The label released several projects such as Partage EP of Michael Kiessou, La loi de la nature of Dynastie le tigre and Parti De Rien of Georges Breezy.

2016 - present : Philjohn Investment Holding and restructuring 

In November 2016, HMG had new shareholders such as HTD & Penthold, which bought the respective shares of Armel Nango and Philippe Nkouaya. HMG becomes a subsidiary of Henthold and joins the conglomerate with sister companies Hope Music Publishing, Hope Management & Consulting (HOMCO), YASHA Corp., Hope Clothing, Philjohn Technologies & Hope Entertainment Pictures (HentPix).

In February 2017, an edition service is coupled with those of the label via the sister company Hope Music Publishing which has a catalog of more than 700 songs and added to that of HMG, brings back a catalog of more than 1000 songs. In November 2017 hope music group signs a distribution deal with a Gabonese label the node music through Kiss levray.

List of Hope Music Group labels & artists 
In January 2017, the label subdivided its large catalog into 3 under separate labels, Binam Nation, Easy Hits Recordz & Bakwaaba Muzik. Each catalog has specific services and specializes in specific areas.

Artistes 

PRESENTS

 Andy Jemea
 Dynastie le tigre
 Featurist
 Ghix
 J-Rio

 Kôba Building
 Michael Kiessou
 Sonia Kay
 Vicky
 Zyon Stylei
 Peka (artiste)

PRIOR ARTISTS

 Fanicko, for Trace TV
 Kayla Lys
 Locko, for Universal Music Group
 Nelly Moukoko

 Obeytheking
 Tenor, for Universal Music Group
 Valeri Williams, for Keyzit
 Yvich

Publishing 

Artists
 DJ Kessy
 DJ Kriss
 LMTY
 Ovadoz
 Philjohn
 Tris 

Distributed Labels
 King Kurtis Entertainment
 Clovis Music
 Tatco Group
 LJ Music

Discography

2013 - 2016 
No More Stranger vol.1 – Philjohn
 Jemea - Andy Jemea
Partage – Michael Kiessou
La Loi de la nature – Dynastie le tigre
Parti de rien – Georges Breezy
Partage Deluxe – Michael Kiessou
No More Stranger vol.2 – Philjohn
La loi de la nature (Deluxe Edition) – Dynastie le tigre

2017
 Mon Elan - Serum
 Homog3ne – Dynastie le tigre
 Kayfriends - Sonia Kay
 Jabea (EP) - Yvich
 Nomtema - Michael Kiessou

2018
 The Bridge - Locko
 Blvck Roses – Kôba Building
 Heros - J-Rio
 Comme Une Etoile - Zyon Stylei
 No Luv - LeHess
 Point G - Ghix
 Arrete Nous Si Tu Peux - Featurist
 V3rsatile - Seoud Drums

Awards and recognition

References 

Record labels established in 2012
Cameroonian independent record labels
Mass media in Cameroon
Culture in Douala
Companies based in Douala